Kokoutse Fabrice Dabla (born 20 November 1992) is an athlete from Togo who represented his country at the 2016 and 2020 Summer Olympics.

He competed in the 2016 Men's 200 metres track race, but finished seventh in his heat with a time of 21.63 seconds and did not advance. Although there were eight entrants in the heat, Kenyan Mike Nyang'au did not start, meaning Dabla finished last among those who did. He fared better in the Athletics at the 2020 Summer Olympics – Men's 100 metres in which he qualified from the preliminary races in a time of 10.57 seconds.

References

External links

Olympic athletes of Togo
Athletes (track and field) at the 2016 Summer Olympics
Togolese male sprinters
1992 births
Living people
World Athletics Championships athletes for Togo
Athletes (track and field) at the 2019 African Games
African Games competitors for Togo
Athletes (track and field) at the 2020 Summer Olympics
Olympic male sprinters
21st-century Togolese people